The Adventures of Sherlock Holmes (released theatrically as Sherlock Holmes in the United Kingdom) is a 1939 American mystery adventure film based on Sir Arthur Conan Doyle's Sherlock Holmes detective stories. Although claiming to be an adaptation of the 1899 play Sherlock Holmes by William Gillette, the film bears little resemblance to the play.

Released by 20th Century Fox, the film is the second of fourteen Sherlock Holmes films produced between 1939 and 1946, starring Basil Rathbone as Holmes and Nigel Bruce as Dr. John Watson. The Adventures of Sherlock Holmes is the final film in the series to be released by 20th Century Fox and the final to be set in the Victorian period of Doyle’s stories (all subsequent films would be released by Universal Pictures and set in contemporaneous times (i.e. the 1940s).

The film co-stars George Zucco as Holmes's nemesis, Professor Moriarty, and follows Holmes and Watson as they attempt to foil Moriarty’s plans to target a wealthy family and steal the Crown Jewels.

Background
The film was supposedly based on the stage play by William Gillette, though little of the play's original plot remains aside from the Holmes/Moriarty conflict. The play featured a very young Charlie Chaplin in one of his very first acting roles during its first London production, playing the character of Billy, who, in this movie, is played by Terry Kilburn.

Plot
The film is set in 1894. The picture begins with Moriarty and Sherlock Holmes verbally sparring on the steps outside the Old Bailey, where Moriarty has just been acquitted on a charge of murder owing to lack of evidence. Holmes remarks, "You have a magnificent brain, Moriarty. I admire it. I admire it so much I'd like to present it, pickled in alcohol, to the London Medical Society." "It would make an impressive exhibit," replies Moriarty.

Holmes and Watson are visited at 221B Baker Street by Ann Brandon (Ida Lupino). She tells him that her brother Lloyd has received a strange note: a drawing of a man with an albatross hanging around his neck, identical to one received by her father just before his brutal murder ten years before. Holmes deduces that the note is a warning and rushes to find Lloyd Brandon. He is too late, as Lloyd has been murdered by being strangled and having his skull crushed.

Holmes, disguised as a music-hall entertainer, attends a garden party, where he correctly believes an attempt will be made on Ann's life. Hearing her cries from a nearby park, he captures her assailant, who turns out to be Gabriel Mateo, out for revenge on the Brandons for the murder of his father by Ann's father in a dispute over ownership of their South American mine. His murder weapon was a bola. Mateo also reveals that it was Moriarty who urged him to seek revenge.

Holmes realises that Moriarty is using the case as a distraction from his real crime, a crime that will stir the British Empire: an attempt to steal the Crown Jewels. Holmes rushes to the Tower of London, where, during a struggle, Moriarty falls, presumably to his death. In the end, Ann is married and Holmes tries to shoo a fly by playing the violin, only to have Watson swat it with his newspaper, remarking, "Elementary, my dear Holmes, elementary."

Cast
 Basil Rathbone as Sherlock Holmes
 Nigel Bruce as Dr. Watson
 Ida Lupino as Ann Brandon
 George Zucco as Professor Moriarty
 Alan Marshal as Jerrold Hunter
 Terry Kilburn as Billy
 Henry Stephenson as Sir Ronald Ramsgate
 E. E. Clive as Inspector Bristol 
 Arthur Hohl as Bassick
 Mary Forbes as Lady Conyngham
 Peter Willes as Lloyd Brandon
 Mary Gordon as Mrs. Hudson
 Frank Dawson as Dawes
 George Regas as Matteo 
 William Austin as Passerby 
 Holmes Herbert as Justice of the Court

Accolades
"Elementary, my dear Watson." was ranked 65th in the American Film Institute 2005 list AFI's 100 Years...100 Movie Quotes.

Influence
The quote "Elementary, my dear Watson" was made popular by this film. Although it was spoken in the 1929 talkie The Return of Sherlock Holmes starring Clive Brook and in the films featuring Arthur Wontner, it was never featured in a canonical Arthur Conan Doyle story, although once Holmes said, in the 1893 story "The Adventure of the Crooked Man", "Elementary".

During the scene in which Holmes crashes the garden party dressed as a music hall performer, he sings "I Do Like To be Beside the Seaside". This is an anachronism, since the film is set in 1894, but the song was written in 1907.

The scene in which Holmes experiments with the flies in the glass while playing the violin is recreated in the 2009 film Sherlock Holmes, in which Holmes is played by Robert Downey Jr.

In the episode "The Reichenbach Fall" of the BBC/PBS series, Sherlock is heavily inspired by the film and other Rathbone-Bruce films (creators Steven Moffat and Mark Gatiss have named the films as the show's primary inspiration).

References

External links

 
 
 
 
 The Adventures of Sherlock Holmes

1939 films
1939 mystery films
American detective films
1930s English-language films
American black-and-white films
Sherlock Holmes films based on works by Arthur Conan Doyle
Films based on British novels
Films based on multiple works
Films based on mystery novels
American films based on plays
Films based on short fiction
Films set in London
20th Century Fox films
Films directed by Alfred L. Werker
Films scored by David Raksin
Films produced by Darryl F. Zanuck
Films set in 1894
1930s American films